Alexandra (minor planet designation: 54 Alexandra) is a carbonaceous asteroid from the intermediate asteroid belt, approximately 155 kilometers in diameter. It was discovered by German-French astronomer Hermann Goldschmidt on 10 September 1858, and named after the German explorer Alexander von Humboldt; it was the first asteroid to be named after a male.

Description 

On May 17, 2005, this asteroid occulted a faint star (magnitude 8.5) and the event was observed and timed in a number of locations within the U.S. and Mexico. As a result, a silhouette profile was produced, yielding a roughly oval cross-section with dimensions of 160 × 135 km (± 1 km).

Photometric observations of this asteroid during 1990–92 gave a light curve with a period of 18.14 ± 0.04 hours and a brightness variation of 0.10 in magnitude. Alexandra has been studied by radar. It was the namesake and largest member of the former Alexandra asteroid family; a dynamic group of C-type asteroids that share similar orbital elements. Other members included 70 Panopaea and 145 Adeona. 145 Adeona was subsequently assigned to the Adeona family, with Alexandra and Panopaea being dropped.

In Popular Culture

In the Swedish film Aniara (2018) it is mentioned that 54 Alexandra is the closest celestial body which the off-course and out-of-control spacecraft will approach before it leaves the Solar System.

References

External links 
 Lightcurve plot of 54 Alexandra, Palmer Divide Observatory, B. D. Warner (2008)
 Asteroid Lightcurve Database (LCDB), query form (info )
 Dictionary of Minor Planet Names, Google books
 Asteroids and comets rotation curves, CdR – Observatoire de Genève, Raoul Behrend
 Discovery Circumstances: Numbered Minor Planets (1)-(5000) – Minor Planet Center
 
 

000054
Discoveries by Hermann Goldschmidt
Named minor planets
000054
000054
18580910